Velička is a Czech surname that may refer to the following notable people:

Andrius Velička (born 1979), Lithuanian football player
Arnas Velička (born 1999), Lithuanian basketball player
Leandro Nunes Velicka (born 1986), Brazilian football player
Petr Velička (born 1967), Czech chess grandmaster

Czech-language surnames